Paldiski is a town and Baltic Sea port situated on the Pakri Peninsula of northwestern Estonia. Since 2017, it's the administrative centre of Lääne-Harju Parish of Harju County. Previously a village of Estonia-Swedes known by the historical name Rågervik, it was extended into a Russian naval base in the 18th century.

The Russian authorities renamed it Балтийский Порт ("Baltiyskiy Port", i.e., Baltic Port) in 1762. In written Estonian, the name was spelled Baltiski until 1933, when the phonetically spelled version Paldiski became official.

History

Swedish Empire 

Paldiski was founded as a fishing village by Estonian Swedes with the name Rågervik.

Russian Empire 
Peter the Great chose the location  in 1715 for a naval base, and construction started in 1716. It was meant to be a sea fortress and in 1790, during the Russo-Swedish War, it was conquered by the Swedes through trickery, when a Swedish warship sailing under a Dutch flag was allowed to dock.
On 23 June 1912 the Russian emperor Nikolai II and German kaiser Wilhelm II met for the last time before World War I in Paldiski.

Since the 18th century, Leetse manor existed there. In the 1910s the manor ceased to exist and was formed the populated place called Leetse.

Republic of Estonia 

From 1920-1940, Paldiski was a regular Estonian small town. The main economic activities were fishing, fish processing and agriculture. Town had Lutherian Nikolai church, built in 1842 and Orthodox Saint George church, built in 1784.
1922-1935 there was gymnasium.
1939 Soviet Union started building naval base in Paldiski under Basis Treaty. In 1940 whole population of Paldiski was removed and relocated. The town was populated by Soviet military personnel and their family members from Soviet Union. From that year Paldiski became gradually closed city for average Estonian residents until 1990.

Soviet era 
Soviet naval base headquarters was located in Paldiski. During World War II, Germans occupied town 28th August 1941 and left 1944. During the retreat, most of the town was burnt down, only 20 buildings survived. In 1962, Paldiski became a Soviet Navy nuclear submarine training centre. The training center had whole soviet nuclear submarine constructed by complete sections for naval personnel training purposes. The training center, known by locals as Pentagon, was demolished largely by 2007 Employing some 16,000 people, and with two land-based nuclear reactors (at 70 MW and 90 MW power, respectively), it was the largest such facility in the Soviet Union. In total Soviet navy used the facilities 27 years. Because of its importance, the whole city was closed off with barbed wire until the Russian military base was finally closed in 31st August 1994. Paldiski nuclear centre was handed by Russians to Estonian authorities in 30 September 1995.

This followed the events of 1991, when the Soviet Union collapsed and Estonia regained independence. To house the stationing troops and those in training, many barracks buildings were built, which have since been left in disrepair. Russia relinquished control of reactor facilities in September 1995; the nuclear reactors were shut down in 1989, first on temporary basis because of Chernobyl accident and due to the collapse of Soviet union, it became permanent, and nuclear material was transported back to Russia in 1994. The reactors were thereafter decommissioned. The reactors were protected with sarcophagus, finished by 2006, in Paldiski as they were potentially dangerous due to the radioactivity.

Incidents, when Paldiski was a closed military town under Soviet/Russian jurisdiction, did happen rarely and if something happened, it was classified. At the time Jüri Liim, first member of Supreme council and later expert of Estonian Ministry of Defence and Estonian government special representative in Paldiski, had an undercover and secret access to the closed city. As per his testimony, the Pakri Islands just next to Paldiski were the practice bombing targets for Soviet air force, including the soviet nuclear bombers. There was no actual nuclear bombs used but bombs that were in similar weight and size category. Sometimes when the real combat bombs were used, the small earthquakes created from it could be felt in Paldiski and at the nuclear reactors.

The personnel working at the site were concerned about potential cracks or other issues with the reactor due to this shaking. When approaching the Pakri Islands or leaving from the target, the flight routes were often over Paldiski and this led to few incidents. Once a live bomb fell by accident to the local kindergartens cabbage field. Fortunately the bomb malfunctioned and caused no damage. On another occasion, a bomb fell by accident 15 meters from the working nuclear reactors. This bomb also malfunctioned and did not explode.

After Estonia regaining independence 
After Estonia restored its independence, the city had not enough Estonian citizens, and Paldiski was then subordinated to Keila until 30 October 1996. Located some 45 km west of Tallinn, Paldiski was then made a municipality within Harju County. Derelict Soviet-style apartment buildings made up much of the town, and the relics of military bases were widespread. The significant portion of the town's residents are ethnic Russians, originally from other parts of Soviet Union and were relocated to Estonian Soviet Socialist Republic by Soviet policy. The ferry company Tallink operates a regular connection with Kapellskär in Sweden. Danish ferry operator DFDS is also operates a regular connection on the same route.

Operation «Ämblik» (Spider) was conducted in Paldiski on 16 March 1993 by 33 Estonian police officers and 40 border guards to establish Estonian law in the area, including in the Russian military base. At the time in Paldiski, there was about 1,500 members of the Russian armed forces. The aim of the police operation was to contain illegal activities including weapons trade and to restrict the activities of thugs in Paldiski, who behaved like they ran the town. For example on 9 March 1993, several Russian armed forces officers were detained by Estonian authorities in Tallinn due to an attempt to sell firearms. This operation was not agreed to with the Russian government beforehand and preparations were kept in secrecy. Confusion in Paldiski among Russian military personnel helped to achieve the goals of the operation.
Operation had a shock effect on the criminal element as per Jüri Liim. 

In 21st April 1993, there was half a dozen Estonian police officers and Estonian border service.

Today 

The amenities in Paldiski include three grocery stores, a pizza place, a tavern, and a café.

The housing blocks in the town do not all appear dilapidated and abandoned, and several have been refitted and re-painted in recent years. There are also several new apartment buildings, and the green areas along with children's parks have been restored.

The Logistics Battalion of the Estonian Defence Forces is stationed in Paldiski.

The Pakri Science and Industrial Park with its 60 hectare Pakri Smart Industrial City lies within the limits of the city.

Climate

Education and community
Paldiski has two schools: Paldiski Gümnaasium and Vene Gümnaasium (Russian Gymnasium).

In addition, there is a private pre-school facility, called Paladski Beebi Maja.

There are several churches in town. The Estonian Evangelical Lutheran Church is dedicated to St Nicholas. Although closed for some years, this church has now reopened, with services held every Sunday at lunchtime. There are also a Pentecostal church, a Methodist church, and an Orthodox church.

Transport

Paldiski is served by Paldiski railway station, a terminus station on the Elron rail line between Tallinn and Paldiski, providing a convenient link to the capital city. As part of the town's redevelopment, this once near-derelict station has been renovated and painted in bright yellow and white colours.

A great deal of investment has been put into the two ports and their facilities with a number of new berths having been created.  From Paldiski Southern Port, Transfennica runs a number of ships to the port from Hanko (Finland) and Lübeck (Germany). From Paldiski Northern Port, DFDS runs a six-roundtrip operation to Kapellskär (Sweden) for passengers, and a Cargo and Navirail operation to and from Hanko (Finland).

The old Soviet 'Pentagon' building has been demolished at some point between 2006 and 2009 to make way for a large and modern logistics park.

Energy
The Pakri wind farm is located in Paldiski at the tip of the Pakri peninsula near the old lighthouse. It consists of eight wind turbines of type Nordex N-90, and generates 18.4 MW of clean electricity, when the wind matches the parametres of the turbines.

Since 2007 Pakri Smart Industrial City is developing a 75MW renewable power network, combined with its own Pakri Smart Grid.

A 550 MW / 6 GWh (12-hour) pumped-storage hydroelectricity plant is scheduled for 2028.

The Balticconnector bi-directional natural gas pipeline between Ingå, Finland and Paldiski has operated since 2020. Construction of a receiving LNG terminal near the town is considered.

Estonia's long-term plans for nuclear power envisage the adjacent Pakri Islands as a potential site for the country's first power plant.

In popular culture
The 1999 film Screwed in Tallinn takes place at a hotel in Paldiski.

The 2002 film Lilya 4-ever, set in an unnamed "former republic of the Soviet Union", was largely filmed in Paldiski.

The 2015 music video for Alan Walker's popular song "Faded" was in part filmed in or around Paldiski.

Paldiski is featured in the video game Euro Truck Simulator 2.

YouTuber Bald and Bankrupt visited Paldiski in 2021 as part of his series on his adventures in Estonia.

The town and port feature prominently in Arthur Ransome's yacht cruising memoir Racundra's First Cruise

Notable people
Amandus Adamson (1855–1929), Estonian sculptor and painter; lived and worked in Paldiski
Balder Tomasberg (1897–1919), Estonian painter
Viire Valdma (born 1960), Estonian actress 
Salawat Yulayev (1754–1800), Bashkir national hero

Gallery

References

External links 

Cities and towns in Estonia
Former municipalities of Estonia
Lääne-Harju Parish
Populated places in Harju County
Populated coastal places in Estonia
Port cities and towns of the Baltic Sea
Russian and Soviet Navy bases
Planned cities
Russian and Soviet Navy submarine bases
Kreis Harrien
Port cities and towns in Estonia